The 1976 Benson & Hedges Championships, also known as the Wembley Championships, was a men's tennis tournament played on indoor carpet courts at the Wembley Arena in London in England that was part of the 1976 Commercial Union Assurance Grand Prix circuit and categorized as a Four Star event. The tournament was held from 15 November through 21 November 1976. On request of first-seeded Jimmy Connors, citing doctor's advise on his back and ankle injuries, the final was rescheduled from a best-of-five to a best-of-three set format. At 4-all in the second set Connors survived 0-40 and five breakpoints in total to claim the singles title and the accompanying £12,500 first-prize money

Finals

Singles
 Jimmy Connors defeated  Roscoe Tanner 3–6, 7–6(8–6), 6–4
 It was Connors' 12th singles title of the year and the 53rd of his career.

Doubles
 Roscoe Tanner /  Stan Smith defeated  Wojtek Fibak /  Brian Gottfried 7–6, 6–3

References

External links
 ITF tournament edition details

Benson and Hedges Championships
Wembley Championships
Benson and Hedges Championships
Benson and Hedges Championships
Benson and Hedges Championships
Tennis in London